Deer Apartments is the first album from Matt Pond PA, released in 1998. Their debut gained them recognition in CDNow's Unheard? competition for unsigned artists that same year. Deer Apartments is currently out of print.

Track listing
 "For Sale" – 3:56
 "Fortune Flashlight" – 3:12
 "Perfect Fit" – 3:58
 "The Lettuce" – 4:37
 "Stars And Scars" – 3:37
 "Green Pennies" – 3:01
 "Deer Season" – 2:13
 "Electric" – 3:52
 "Corn Stalks" – 3:26
 "Riser Two" – 3:22
 "Possibilities Of Summer" – 2:44
 "Hunter" – 2:32
 "Bad Idea" – 3:26
 "Full As Full" – 3:14
 "Apology" – 3:15

1998 debut albums
Matt Pond PA albums